Lake Park Township is a township in Becker County, Minnesota. The population was 418 as of the 2000 census.

Lake Park Township was organized in 1870.

Geography

The city of Lake Park is entirely within this township geographically but is a separate entity.

Major highway
  U.S. Route 10

Lakes
 Anderson Lake
 Axberg Lake
 Bijou Lake
 Boyer Lake (west three-quarters)
 Cuba Lake (southeast three-quarters)
 Dahlberg Lake (northwest half)
 Forget-Me-Not Lake
 Gourd Lake
 Horan Lake
 La Belle Lake (southwest edge)
 Lee Lake
 Lime Lake (southeast three-quarters)
 Little Boyer Lake
 Lake Engebretson
 Olive Lake
 Orange Lake
 Peach Lake
 Pineapple Lake
 Prestrude Lake
 Prune Lake
 Pump Lake
 Round Lake
 Sand Lake
 Shoe Lake
 Sorenson Lake
 Stakke Lake
 Yort Lake

Adjacent townships
 Cuba Township (north)
 Hamden Township (northeast)
 Audubon Township (east)
 Lake Eunice Township (southeast)
 Cormorant Township (south)
 Parke Township, Clay County (southwest)
 Eglon Township, Clay County (west)
 Highland Grove Township, Clay County (northwest)

Cemeteries
The township contains these four cemeteries: Eskjo, Houglum, Oak Grove and Strandvik.

Demographics
As of the census of 2000, there were 418 people, 149 households, and 109 families residing in the township.  The population density was 13.6 people per square mile (5.3/km2).  There were 188 housing units at an average density of 6.1/sq mi (2.4/km2).  The racial makeup of the township was 99.28% White, 0.48% Native American, and 0.24% from two or more races. Hispanic or Latino of any race were 1.20% of the population.

There were 149 households, out of which 28.2% had children under the age of 18 living with them, 65.1% were married couples living together, 4.7% had a female householder with no husband present, and 26.8% were non-families. 23.5% of all households were made up of individuals, and 6.7% had someone living alone who was 65 years of age or older.  The average household size was 2.42 and the average family size was 2.86.

In the township the population was spread out, with 18.9% under the age of 18, 4.8% from 18 to 24, 21.5% from 25 to 44, 26.8% from 45 to 64, and 28.0% who were 65 years of age or older.  The median age was 48 years. For every 100 females, there were 102.9 males.  For every 100 females age 18 and over, there were 106.7 males.

The median income for a household in the township was $40,972, and the median income for a family was $47,500. Males had a median income of $35,972 versus $25,875 for females. The per capita income for the township was $20,983.  None of the families and 1.1% of the population were living below the poverty line, including no under eighteens and none of those over 64.

References
 United States National Atlas
 United States Census Bureau 2007 TIGER/Line Shapefiles
 United States Board on Geographic Names (GNIS)

Townships in Becker County, Minnesota
Townships in Minnesota